The Traditional Britain Group (TBG) is a British far-right pressure group that describes itself as traditionalist conservative and "home to the disillusioned patriot". It was founded in 2001 by Gregory Lauder-Frost, with the late Merlin Hanbury-Tracy, 7th Baron Sudeley as its president. 

Advocacy group Hope not Hate claims TBG is part of a UK-wide network linked to the European alt-right. Private Eye has described TBG as far-right and a successor to the WGI.

History and ideology
TBG was founded in 2001. It opposes non-white immigration to the UK and, prior to Brexit, it opposed the UK's European Union membership. The organisation's stated principles include opposition to egalitarianism; the centrality of the heterosexual family as the primary social unit; traditional Christian values and maintaining the Church of England as England's established church; rolling back of the welfare state; and opposition to immigration, multiculturalism, political correctness and Marxism. 

TBG is in favour of state-sponsored repatriation. Their Facebook page carried a post calling for the deportation of anti-racist campaigner Doreen Lawrence and "millions of others... to their natural homelands". Gregory Lauder-Frost, the founder of TBG, called Lawrence a spiv. Lauder-Frost was formerly the officer of the Conservative pressure group Monday Club and Vice-President of the Western Goals Institute (WGI).

Speakers

TBG has been addressed by speakers such as Simon Heffer and Sir Roger Scruton. In 2011, Gerard Batten, former leader of the UK Independence Party (UKIP) spoke at the group's annual dinner; upon his election as leader, UKIP said Batten "does not share the views of TBG. He is invited by many organisations to speak and TBG had a list of reputable speakers such as Simon Heffer previous to his invitation. Since he attended things have come to light. He would not consider a further invitation." 

TBG came to national prominence when Liberal Conspiracy said Conservative MP Jacob Rees-Mogg spoke as a guest of honour at the TBG's 2013 annual dinner. Three months later, this led to criticism of Rees-Mogg, who then said he had not properly checked the organisation before speaking, despite being warned by Searchlight about TBG's far-right associations prior to attendance; Rees-Mogg disassociated himself from the group and apologised for his attendance, calling it "a mistake". It was also attended by former Ulster Unionist Party MP John Taylor, Baron Kilclooney. Two months later, American white nationalist Richard Spencer was invited to address the group.

Hope not Hate noted the 2017 annual conference was addressed by Anne Marie Waters, former UKIP candidate and founder of the For Britain party; Martin Sellner, leader of the Austrian Identitarian Movement and attended by Mark Collett, former leader of the youth wing of the British National Party. In March of that year, the Bow Group granted TBG a special concession to its 65th anniversary celebrations.

In October 2018, James Thompson, a former senior lecturer at UCL, pulled out of his speaking slot at the group's annual conference at the last minute following pressure from the media. Thompson lost his honorary professorship at UCL after Private Eye "revealed he had been organising secretive conferences on racial eugenics – and inviting notorious white supremacists" (see London Conference on Intelligence controversy). The columnist Katie Hopkins spoke at TBG's 2018 annual conference. 

Estonian Finance Minister Martin Helme addressed the 2019 conference, as did the vice-chairman of the Polish National Movement Krzysztof Bosak.

Katie Fanning, a former director of UKIP, spoke at the 2021 conference on the subject of "anti-white messaging and critical race theory-based teachings" in Britain's universities, and that she was suing her former university for discrimination. Gunnar Beck, a German politician, academic and lawyer, spoke to the group on the "Strange Death of Europe".

See also
Cornerstone Group
Conservative Democratic Alliance
Eldon League
Far-right politics in the United Kingdom
High Tory

References

External links
 

Conservative political advocacy groups in the United Kingdom
Political and economic think tanks based in the United Kingdom
Foreign policy and strategy think tanks based in the United Kingdom
Anti-immigration politics in the United Kingdom
Euroscepticism in the United Kingdom
2001 establishments in the United Kingdom
Criticism of multiculturalism
White nationalism in the United Kingdom
Alt-right organizations
Think tanks established in 2001